Bruce Cutler (born April 29, 1948) is an American criminal defense lawyer best known for having defended John Gotti, and for media appearances as a legal commentator.

Life and career
Cutler's father, Murray Cutler, was a New York City detective who later became a criminal defense attorney. While being interviewed on the radio program Conversations With Allan Wolper on WBGO 88.3 FM, Cutler said that he was inspired by his father's pro-labor, pro-union loyalties to a FDR-style Social Democratic position.

Growing up in Flatbush, he graduated from Poly Prep Country Day School.

Formerly a Brooklyn Assistant District Attorney, Cutler gained notoriety in the 1980s when he won three acquittals for Gambino Crime Family boss John Gotti (including one where at least one juror accepted a bribe in return for voting to find Gotti not guilty).

When Gotti was indicted in 1990 for the 1985 murder of Paul Castellano and several other crimes, presiding judge I. Leo Glasser disqualified Cutler and two associates from representing Gotti.  Citing evidence from wiretaps at Gotti's Ravenite club, prosecutors contended that Cutler and his colleagues may have known about criminal activity.  Since the attorney–client privilege does not apply in these circumstances, prosecutors argued that Cutler was "part of the evidence" and thus liable to be called as a witness.  They also argued that Cutler had represented other potential witnesses and thus had a conflict of interest.  Glasser sided with the prosecutors, contending that Cutler was the "in-house counsel" for the Gambino family.

Cutler appeared in the Robert De Niro and Ed Burns film, 15 Minutes, playing himself.  He also appeared on Court TV, with attorney Ed Hayes, discussing criminal cases and current events on Cutler and Hayes, and on the CW network has his own TV show, Jury Duty. He also made two guest star appearances in the episodes "Drawing Dead" and "Open Secrets" of the 4th season of the CBS show Blue Bloods. He is godfather to Hayes' daughter, Avery.  Cutler is estranged from his family including his brother, sister, and his son.

Cutler was the lead defense attorney for Phil Spector until August 27, 2007, when he announced that he was leaving Spector's defense due to "a difference of opinion between Mr. Spector and me on strategy."

References

External links
 Bruce Cutler, Attorney at Law
 CW network Jury Duty site
 

1948 births
Living people
New York (state) lawyers
Hamilton College (New York) alumni
Brooklyn Law School alumni
Criminal defense lawyers
People from Flatbush, Brooklyn
Poly Prep alumni